The 1966 Montana State Bobcats football team was an American football team that represented Montana State University in the Big Sky Conference during the 1966 NCAA College Division football season. In its fourth season under head coach Jim Sweeney, the team compiled an 8–3 record (4–0 against Big Sky opponents) and won the conference championship.

Schedule

References

Montana State
Montana State Bobcats football seasons
Big Sky Conference football champion seasons
Montana State Bobcats football